Caujac is a commune in the Haute-Garonne department in southwestern France.

Geography
The commune is bordered by five other communes: Auterive to the north, Grazac to the northwest, Esperce to the west, Cintegabelle to the east, and finally by Gaillac-Toulza to the south.

Population

See also
Communes of the Haute-Garonne department

References

Communes of Haute-Garonne